This is a list of presidents of the Royal College of Surgeons in Ireland.

(additional years shown in brackets)

1700s
 1784-85 Samuel Croker-King
 1786 John Whiteway
 1787 Robert Bowes
 1788 Philip Woodroffe
 1789 William Dease
 1790 Ralph Smith O’bré 
 1791 Francis M'Evoy (1804, 1807)
 1792 George Stewart (1799)
 1793 George Renny
 1794 Solomon Richards (1803, 1808, 1818)
 1795 Gustavus Hume
 1795 Clement Archer
 1796 Francis L'Estrange
 1797 William Hartigan
 1798 Robert Moore Peile (1816)
 1799 George Stewart (1792)

1800s
 1800 Sir Henry Jebb
 1801 James Rivers
 1802 Abraham Colles (1830)
 1803 Solomon Richards (1794, 1808, 1818)
 1804 Francis M'Evoy (1791, 1807)
 1805 Robert Hamilton
 1806 Gerard Macklin
 1807 Francis M'Evoy (1791, 1804)
 1808 Solomon Richards (1794, 1803, 1818)
 1809 Richard Dease
 1810 John Armstrong Garnett
 1811 Philip Crampton (1820, 1844, 1855)
 1812 John Creighton (1824)
 1813 Richard Carmichael (1826, 1845)
 1814 Cusack Roney (1828)
 1815 Samuel Wilmot (1832, 1846)
 1816 Robert Moore Peile (1792)
 1817 Andrew Johnston
 1818 Solomon Richards (1794, 1803, 1808)
 1819 Thomas Hewson
 1820 Philip Crampton (1811, 1844, 1855)
 1821 Charles Hawkes Todd
 1822 James Henthorn
 1823 John Kirby (1834)
 1824 John Creighton (1812)
 1825 Alexander Read (1835)
 1826 Richard Carmichael (1813, 1845)
 1827 James William Cusack (1847, 1858)
 1828 Cusack Roney (1814)
 1829 William Auchinleck
 1830 Abraham Colles (1802)
 1831 Rawdon Macnamara primus
 1832 Samuel Wilmot (1815, 1846)
 1833 James Kerin
 1834 John Kirby (1823)
 1835 Alexander Read (1825)
 1836 Francis White
 1837 Arthur Jacob (1864)
 1838 William Henry Porter
 1839 Maurice Collis
 1840 Robert Adams (1860, 1867)
 1841 Thomas Rumley
 1842 William Tagert
 1843 James O'Beirne
 1844 Philip Crampton (1811, 1820, 1855)
 1845 Richard Carmichael (1813, 1826)
 1846 Samuel Wilmot (1815, 1832)
 1847 James William Cusack (1827, 1858)
 1848 Robert Harrison
 1849 Andrew Ellis
 1850 Thomas Edward Beatty

References

Royal College of Surgeons in Ireland
Presidents of the Royal College of Surgeons in Ireland